Jamila Mujahed is a journalist of Afghanistan.

Career
In 2001, she broadcast the news that the Taliban regime had fallen.
Hamida Ghafour, writing in The Daily Telegraph reported that she had been appointed a delegate to the Constitutional Loya Jirga.
She was not, however, on the official list of delegates.

In October 2002, the United States Department of State awarded her a liberty award.

Mujahid had been a television journalist before the Taliban's seizure of power.

References

Afghan journalists
Living people
Year of birth missing (living people)